Nomads United is an association football club based in Casebrook, Christchurch, New Zealand. They currently compete in the Southern League.

Club history
Nomads were a prominent team in early New Zealand football, reaching the later rounds of the Chatham Cup on several occasions and reaching the final in 1931. Though no longer the force they were in the early years of organised football in the country, the team again reached the final in 1963, although their best result in recent years has been to reach the quarter-finals in 2007.

Nomads United was founded in 1910 as Nomads FC in eastern Christchurch with an original intention of operating from temporary headquarters in one suburb after another, to foster local interest in the sport. At the time, football was in its infancy in New Zealand, with Nomads being only the fourth club founded in the South Island. The club colours of red, white, and blue date from these early days and were taken in honour of the then colours of prominent English team Chelsea.

Nomads had several home grounds during their early years, including English Park, Richmond Park, and - after amalgamation with Shirley FC in the 1960s - Malvern Park and McFarlane Park in Shirley. For some time after this merger the team were known as Shirley/Nomads. The club moved from Shirley to Papanui in 1969, settling permanently at Tulett Park, and in 1972 the club changed its name to Nomads United AFC. In 1975 a women's team was added to the roster of teams at Nomads United.

Despite financial problems during the early 1980s, Nomads United have survived and remain the second-oldest team in the Christchurch area.

References

External links
Nomads United Home
NZ Clubs Database

Association football clubs in Christchurch
1910 establishments in New Zealand